Two-time defending champion Novak Djokovic defeated Daniil Medvedev in the final, 7–5, 6–2, 6–2 to win the men's singles tennis title at the 2021 Australian Open. It was his record-extending ninth Australian Open title and his 18th major title overall. With his fourth round win against Milos Raonic, Djokovic joined Roger Federer as only the second man with 300 or more match wins in major singles competitions.

This marked the first major main-draw appearance for future world No. 1 Carlos Alcaraz; he lost to Mikael Ymer in the second round. At 17 years old, Alcaraz became the youngest man to win a main-draw match at the Australian Open since Bernard Tomic in the 2009 Australian Open, defeating fellow qualifier Botic van de Zandschulp in the previous round.

Aslan Karatsev became the first male qualifier to reach a major semifinal since Vladimir Voltchkov in the 2000 Wimbledon Championships, and the first since Bob Giltinan in December 1977 to do so at the Australian Open. He was also the lowest-ranked player to reach a major semifinal since Goran Ivanišević (ranked 125) at the 2001 Wimbledon Championships, the lowest ranked to do so at the Australian Open since Patrick McEnroe (also ranked 114) in 1991, and the first man to reach a major semifinal in the Open Era on his main draw debut.

This was the first major in the Open Era to feature three Russian men in the quarterfinals, those being Karatsev, Medvedev and Andrey Rublev.

Seeds
All seedings per ATP rankings.

Draw

Finals

Top half

Section 1

Section 2

Section 3

Section 4

Bottom half

Section 5

Section 6

Section 7

Section 8

Ranking
The following are the seeded players. Seedings are based on ATP rankings as of 1 February 2021. Rankings and points before are as of 8 February 2021.

Other entry information

Wild cards

Protected ranking

Qualifiers

Lucky losers

Potential lucky losers
  Borna Gojo (did not play)

Withdrawals

See also 
2021 Australian Open – Day-by-day summaries

Explanatory notes

References

External links
 Association of Tennis Professionals (ATP) – 2021 Australian Open Men's Singles draw
 2021 Australian Open – Men's draws and results at the International Tennis Federation

Men's Singles
Australian Open (tennis) by year – Men's singles